P1 Motorsport is a British racing team based in Norfolk, England. They currently compete in the World Series by Renault. For 2013 the team was purchased by Strakka Racing owner-driver Nick Leventis and was renamed P1 by Strakka Racing.

British Formula 3
The team were founded in 1990 by British former Brabham and Lotus F1 engineer Roly Vincini under the name P1 Motorsport and Engineering. In 1992, they entered the British Formula 3 Championship with a three-car team, running under the P1 Racing banner. In their debut season, they finished fifth in the Drivers' championship. The following season they raced under the name P1 Engineering before leaving the series at the end of the year.

After an absence of ten years, the team returned to the series in 2003 as P1 Racing, running a single car for Canadian driver Billy Asaro, who finished the year in fifteenth place. In 2004, the team changed its name again to P1 Motorsport, running Northern Irish driver Adam Carroll and Venezuelan Ernesto Viso. Carroll scored five victories during the year to finish as runner-up to Nelson Piquet Jr. with Viso taking a single win at Knockhill before leaving the team mid-season to join the Formula 3000 series. He was replaced by Malaysian driver Fairuz Fauzy.

2005 saw the team running Brazilian Danilo Dirani in the Championship class and Mexican Salvador Durán in the National class (for older chassis). Dirani won the first two races of the season at Donington Park and took a further three podiums to finish sixth overall, while Durán took nine class wins to comfortably win the National class title. The team withdrew from the championship at the end of the year.

World Series by Renault
In 2007, P1 Motorsport linked-up with Italian team Cram Competition for an assault on the World Series by Renault, with the team being branded as Cram By P1 Europe. Running with drivers Fairuz Fauzy and Briton Pippa Mann, the team finished eleventh in the Teams' championship after scoring three podium finishes.

For the 2008 season, they officially became known as P1 Motorsport with Giedo van der Garde joining the team alongside Pippa Mann. van der Garde took eight podiums during the season, including five race wins, to win the title with two races to spare. Mann scored two points finishes to finish twenty-fifth in the standings. P1 also finished third in the Teams' championship behind Ultimate Signature and champions Tech 1 Racing.

In 2009, P1 ran James Walker and Daniil Move in their two cars. Walker currently lies second in the championship with four races to go. However, P1's aspirations took a blow when their factory caught fire, destroying nearly all the team's assets. They are in the process of tooling up a new workshop in Hethel Engineering Centre, near Norwich.

Complete series results

Formula Renault 3.5 

Notes:
1. – Hartley also scored 50 points for Tech 1 Racing in 11 races.

References

External links
 Official website

British auto racing teams
World Series Formula V8 3.5 teams
British Formula Three teams
Auto racing teams established in 1990
Auto racing teams disestablished in 2013